King George V School, Seremban is a day national secondary school (sekolah menengah kebangsaan) in Malaysia. The enrolment of students is controlled by the state Education Department of Negeri Sembilan. King George V School is classified as a premier school and cluster of school of excellence. It is widely regarded as the most prestigious secondary school in the state of Negeri Sembilan.

Headmasters

School identity

History of the school badge
At first, the logo of SMK KGV was like the picture on the side; it has to do with the figure who gave the name to King George V namely Georgios of Lydda. April 23 was the day of the figure's death commemorated in England and the depiction of George killing a famous dragon was accepted as the school's emblem motif. [2]

There is little controversy over the cross or '+' mark on the logo which is said to be Christian in nature; it itself comes from the flag of England given the nickname Saint George's Cross ("Saint George's Cross"). The logo is changed to look like the image below:

It was again changed because it was considered too brief. The logo as before is used but the '+' symbol is changed to 'V'. This logo is used to this day. [3]

Logo of SMK King George V

Meaning
Color:
Blue, white, and red: Union Jack colors
Symbol:
Rider: Symbolizes good overcoming evil
Crown: Loyal to the king
Letter 'V': Represents King George V

Entry conditions
 Form 1 - Complete Year 6 in any Government Primary School with 3-5As in the UPSR examination. Students from SJK(C) and SJK(T) with 7As (sat for Bahasa Melayu Sekolah Kebangsaan Paper) will be considered. Priority will be given to pupils who obtained high marks in their co-curriculum.
 Form 4 - Minimum 5A achievement in PMR examination inclusive of Science and Mathematics. As of 2012, it has a requirement of 7A or 8A.
 Lower Six - Pass SPM examination and obtained at least three credits inclusive of Malay Language. To enter the Humanity Stream, students must obtain a total aggregate not more than 12 units for the best three subjects. To enter Science Stream, students must obtain at least three credits with the total aggregate not more than 18 units for the best Science subjects.

Sport

The school is organised into five sport houses. The school has a full range of sports facilities. SMKKGV is one of the earliest school to provide swimming pool in Negeri Sembilan.

Rugby team
Rugby is the most popular sport in KGV and has earned the school countless of trophies. KGV's rugby union team is named 'Georgian Rugby'. The team have rivalry mainly with local schools such as Sekolah Datuk Abdul Razak (mainly in the 15s), SMK Zaaba (15s and 10s) and others from all around Malaysia like Kolej Yayasan Saad and Sekolah Menengah Sains Yahya Petra.

In 2006, The come back of the rugby school team, coaching by Mr Razak made the 15s under 18 (senior team) placed 2nd at State level lost by 34–0 with Sekolah Dato Abdul Razak (SDAR) and the 10s under 15 (junior) team placed 1st beat sekolah sukan negeri sembilan (SSNS) formerly known as SMK Za'aba at state level . After 10 years of rest, with the help of Mr Razak, they qualified to the KRM MILO tournament. The tournament was held in Melaka. They lost in the finals with Sekolah Yahya Petra which is a school from Kelantan 5–0. The team is automatically qualified to enter the KRM-MILO Cup in 2007 because they reached the finals of the 2006 KRM. The team consists of mainly form 1, 2, 3, 4 & one form 5. They recently won the Champions in the plate division in the Sains Selangor Satang 10s held by the SM Sains Selangor Old Boys. In 2007 and 2008 the under 15 rugby team won the MSSM / MILO / KRM U15. In 2008 they also won the under 18 (senior) cup (1st place) . They beat Sekolah Sains Tuanku Jaafar (STJ) in the quarter finals,(SSNS) in the semi finals and SMK Teknik Ampangan in the finals. They successfully receive Cluster Award for the project of rugby by the Ministry of education .

Cricket Team
Cricket has been an ever-popular sport in KGV throughout years. The school has produced plenty of state and national players. Credit should go to plenty of teachers and Cricket Masters who have dedicated and devoted countless amounts of time and efforts to keep the spirit of KGV Cricket going. A few influential names in the history of KGV cricket are former teacher and Cricket Master Mr S.Kunaratnam who is also a former President of the Negeri Sembilan Cricket Association, former Georgian and National/State Junior Cricket Coach, the late Mr. M.F Thevaratnam. Towards the end of the '90s, the KGV Cricket teams saw a slight slump in their achievements, always falling short of winning the state MSSNS title to STJ (SM STJ, Kuala Pilah). The new millennia brought new changes to KGV cricket. Under the watchful eyes of teacher and Cricket Master En Rashid Abdul Jalil and coach Mr M.F. Thevaratnam plus the support of Principal En. Samsudin Hamidan, the KGV Cricket team had risen to become state MSSNS champions once again defeating rivals Kolej Tuanku Ja'afar in an entertaining final match at the KTJ Oval in Mantin, Negeri Sembilan in the year 2002 and once again in the year 2004 regaining the Championship after having lost to the international college in the 2003 finals.

Notable Achievements :
 Yr 1999 - U-15 State MSSNS Champions
 Yr 2000 - U-15 State MSSNS Runner's Up
 Yr 2001 - U-15 State MSSNS Champions
 Yr 2002 - U-15 State MSSNS Champions
 Yr 2002 - U-18 State MSSNS Champions
 Yr 2003 - U-18 State MSSNS Runner's Up
 Yr 2004 - U-18 State MSSNS Champions

Extra-curricular activities
There are 22 societies and clubs in KGV. In addition the school runs 12 uniform units.

KGV was also very notable in its high achievements in English related competitions especially Debate, Drama, Choral Speaking and Spell-It-Right. KGV was looked as one of the top debating schools in Malaysia and has always actively participated in invitational debates and college debates.

Notable alumni

 Tan Sri Dato' Seri Dr. Fong Chan Onn - Malaysian former Minister.
 Tuanku Muhriz - Yang di-Pertuan Besar of Negeri Sembilan.
 Dato' Punch Gunalan - Malaysia's top badminton  player.
 Shuhaimi Baba - award-winning film director.
 Suki Low - the first One in a Million winner.
 Ts Shamsul Bahar Mohd Nor - CEO of Malaysian Green Technology and Climate Change Corporation.

References

External links

Buildings and structures in Seremban
Schools in Negeri Sembilan
Secondary schools in Malaysia
Educational institutions established in 1923
1923 establishments in British Malaya